Ways & Means is a double album recorded by Australian artist Paul Kelly and originally released in February 2004, which peaked at #13 on the ARIA Albums Charts. It won the 2004 ARIA Music Award for Best Adult Contemporary Album. It was issued on EMI in Australia and Cooking Vinyl in the US. Kelly's backing band were later called The Boon Companions and consisted of his nephew Dan Kelly on guitar, Peter Luscombe on drums and his brother Dan Luscombe on guitar and keyboards, and Bill McDonald on bass guitar. "Beautiful Feeling" was used as the theme song for the ABCTV series Fireflies (2004).

Paul Kelly & the Boon Companions released a DVD titled, Ways & Means later in 2004. It contained 31 tracks divided into three sections: 15 tracks subtitled, Live in Boston, 12 tracks subtitled, Musicmax Sessions - Live at the Sydney Opera House (recorded on 27 January), and four tracks subtitled, Film Clips.

Background
Ways & Means was released by Paul Kelly on 17 February 2004, which peaked at #13 on the ARIA Albums Charts. Though identified as a solo record, it was more of a group effort, with a backing band later dubbed The Boon Companions co-writing many of the tracks. The Boon Companions consisted of Kelly's nephew Dan Kelly on guitar, Peter Luscombe on drums and his brother Dan Luscombe on guitar and keyboards, and Bill McDonald on bass guitar. On 7 February, the Australian Broadcasting Corporation had started broadcasting the television series Fireflies which featured a score by Kelly and Stephen Rae. The associated soundtrack CD Fireflies: Songs of Paul Kelly included tracks by Kelly, Paul Kelly & the Boon Companions, Professor Ratbaggy (containing Kelly and three earlier bandmates), Paul Kelly with Uncle Bill, and "Los Cucumbros" by the Boon Companions featuring Sian Prior, which was later a track on Stardust Five by Stardust Five (same line-up as Paul Kelly & the Boon Companions).

Track listing

Personnel
Paul Kelly Band aka Paul Kelly & the Boon Companions
Credits:
 Dan Kelly – guitars, vocals
 Paul Kelly – vocals, guitars
 Dan Luscombe – guitars, keyboards
 Peter Luscombe – drums
 Bill McDonald – bass guitar

Production details
 Producer – Tchad Blake, Paul Kelly

Charts

References

2004 albums
Albums produced by Tchad Blake
ARIA Award-winning albums
Paul Kelly (Australian musician) albums
EMI Records albums
Cooking Vinyl albums